Hammamian (also Romanized as Ḩammāmīān, Ḩamāmīān, Ḩammāmiyān, and Ḩamāmiyān; also known as Hammāliān and Hammiān) is a village in Akhtachi-ye Sharqi Rural District, Simmineh District, Bukan County, West Azerbaijan Province, Iran. At the 2006 census, its population was 836, in 160 families.

References 

Populated places in Bukan County